Azerbaijan-India relations are the bilateral relations that exist between the Republic of Azerbaijan and the Republic of India.

History 
India and Azerbaijan have age-old historical relations and shared traditions. The Ateshgah fire temple in the vicinity of Baku is a fine example. This medieval monument with Devanagari and Gurmukhi wall inscriptions is a surviving proof of the age-old relationship between the two countries. The trade links with India, led to renewed contacts of the Indian merchants heading towards Europe through the Silk Route.

Economic relations
India's bilateral trade with Azerbaijan has been growing steadily in recent years. India has a well-established pharmaceutical industry in Azerbaijan and many Indian pharmaceutical companies operate out of Azerbaijan. Some items of direct and indirect imports from India include clothes and textiles, information technologies, food items and heavy machinery, electronic cards, steam boilers and other plant equipment.

The volume of trade has increased from 50 million dollars (2005) to 250 million (2015). India's main import from Azerbaijan is crude oil.

Energy Cooperation
India and Azerbaijan have pledged to explore future prospects in the renewable energy sector, energy efficiency and various upcoming projects in oil and gas and pipelines. Indian company GAIL has also signed a memorandum of understanding with the Azerbaijani firm SOCAR to explore business opportunities in petrochemical projects.

Gazvin-Rasht-Astara railway route
Both sides play a role in constructing the Gazvin-Rasht-Astara (Iran)-Astara (Azerbaijan) railway route as part of the International North–South Transport Corridor. Initially, it is proposed to transport about six million metric tonnes each year and more in the future through this route. It is projected to improve trade relations between Iran and Azerbaijan and at a further stage other countries including India and Russia may also benefit.

Cultural relations 
Cultural ties between Azerbaijan and India are close. The eminent Persian poet Nizami Ganjavi was well known from the times of Amir Khusrau, one of the famous poet and music composer in 1800s. Some other important names are Rashid Behbudov, a famous singer who was also the friend of the Indian actor Raj Kapoor. Azeri artist Rashid Behbudov also promoted Azeri music and art in both countries. Elmira Rahimova, an Azeri singer, also studied Indian dance and music while staying in India. 

Hindu temples can be found in Baku.

Embassy of India, Baku

The Embassy of India in Baku is a diplomatic mission of the Republic of India to Azerbaijan.

Leadership
Ambassador is in charge of the embassy. B. Vanlalvawna is the current Ambassador of India to Azerbaijan.

Jurisdiction
Embassy serves Azerbaijan region.

Education
Scholarships are offered by the embassy to local nationals to study in India.

External links

Diplomatic relations 
Former President of India Sarvepalli Radhakrishnan and Prime Minister Jawaharlal Nehru visited Baku during the Soviet era. India recognized Azerbaijan's independence in 1991. India's Permanent Mission in Baku was opened in 1999 and Azerbaijan's representative center was opened in New-Delhi in 2004. The first bilateral agreement was signed in June 1998. The agreement was the "Economic and Technical Cooperation Treaty" which led to establishment of the Indian-Azerbaijani intergovernmental commission of trade. Other treaties include:

 Economic, Scientific and Technological Cooperation (April 2007)
 Agreement on Air Communication Between the Government of the Azerbaijan and the Government of India (April 2013)
 Agreement on Legal and Judicial Assistance to Civil and Commercial Affairs Between the Republic of Azerbaijan and the Republic of India
 Treaty on Mutual Legal Assistance in Criminal Matters 
 Treaty on Deliveries between the Republic of Azerbaijan and the Republic of India
 Protocol on Cooperation Between the Ministries of Foreign Affairs
 Protocol on the Ratification of the Treaty on Legal and Judicial Assistance for Civil and Commercial Affairs

See also  

 Foreign relations of Azerbaijan
 Foreign relations of India

References

 
India
Bilateral relations of India